Ornativalva sesostrella is a moth of the family Gelechiidae. It was described by Rebel in 1912. It is found in Algeria, Tunisia, Egypt, Sudan, Saudi Arabia, southern Iran and Pakistan.

Adults have been recorded on wing from January to August, and in October and November.

The larvae feed on Tamarix species.

References

Moths described in 1912
Ornativalva